Boos is a commune in the Seine-Maritime department in the Normandy region in northern France.

Geography
Rouen Airport takes up around 25% of the area of the commune's territory.

Heraldry

Population

Places of interest
 The church of St.Sauveur, dating from the sixteenth century.
 A manorhouse dating from the thirteenth century.
 Vestiges of a feudal castle.
 A sixteenth century dovecote, decorated with glazed tiles.

See also
Communes of the Seine-Maritime department

References

Communes of Seine-Maritime